Peskovka is the name of several inhabited localities in Russia.

Urban localities
Peskovka, Kirov Oblast, an urban-type settlement in Omutninsky District of Kirov Oblast

Rural localities
Peskovka, Volgograd Oblast, a selo in Medveditsky Selsoviet of Zhirnovsky District of Volgograd Oblast